Sunon Asogli Thermal Power Station, also Asogli Thermal Power Station, is a  natural gas-fired thermal power station in Ghana. The power station is privately owned by Sunon Asogli Power Ghana Limited. The power plant was the first privately-owned electricity generation installation in the history of Ghana.

Location
The geographical coordinates of Sunon Asogli Thermal Power Station are:05°40'49.0"N, 0°02'50.0"E (Latitude:5.680278; Longitude:0.047222).

Overview
The power station, which came online in 2010, is privately owned by Sunon Asogli Power Ghana Limited. The table below illustrates the shareholding in the stock of Sunon Asogli Power Ghana Limited.

The power station was built in phases. The first phase, with installed capacity of 200 megawatts, was completed in 2010. Often output was less than maximum.

Expansion
The table below illustrates the three phases of construction of the power station. After Phase One, Phase Two and Phase Three were implemented in succession. 

In April 2020, Sunon Asogli Thermal Power Station and the Ghana Grid Company Limited completed the installation of a 330/161 KV interconnecting Auto Transformer at this power station. The new switchgear allows evacuation of more generated electricity with less technical power loss. The project cost US$5.4 million, with Sunon Asogli Power Station contributing US$2 million and Ghana Grid Company contributing the rest.

See also

 List of power stations in Ghana
 Electricity sector in Ghana

References

External links
 Website of Sunon Asogli Thermal Power Station 

Natural gas-fired power stations in Ghana
Eastern Region (Ghana)